The IIFA Best Villain Award is chosen via a worldwide poll and the winner is announced at the ceremony.

Superlatives

Rishi Kapoor and Akshaye Khanna are the only actors to win the award twice.

Naseeruddin Shah and Boman Irani are the only actors nominated 3 times winning once.

Manoj Bajpayee is the only actor nominated 3 times without winning.

Bipasha Basu is the only actress nominated multiple times without winning.

John Abraham, Prakash Raj and Kay Kay Menon are actors nominated twice winning once.

Nana Patekar was also nominated for Best supporting actor the same year.

The winners are listed below:-

See also 
 IIFA Awards
 Bollywood
 Cinema of India

References

External links 
Official site

International Indian Film Academy Awards